Software metering refers to several areas:
Tracking and maintaining software licenses. One needs to make sure that only the allowed number of licenses are in use, and at the same time,  that there are enough licenses for everyone using it. This can include monitoring of concurrent usage of software for real-time enforcement of license limits. Such license monitoring usually includes when a license needs to be updated due to version changes or when upgrades or even rebates are possible.
 Real-time monitoring of all (or selected) applications running on the computers within the organization in order to detect unregistered or unlicensed software and prevent its execution, or limit its execution to within certain hours. The systems administrator can configure the software metering agent on each computer in the organization, for example, to prohibit the execution of games before 17:00.
 Fixed planning to allocate software usage to computers according to the policies a company specifies and to maintain a record of usage and attempted usage. A company can check out and check in licenses for mobile users, and can also keep a record of all licenses in use. This is often used when limited license counts are available to avoid violating strict license controls.
 A method of software licensing where the licensed software automatically records how many times or for how long one or more functions in the software are used, and the user pays fees based on this actual usage (also known as 'pay-per-use')

Short explanation of active/passive software metering
Active software metering occurs when a user is specifically denied use of a metered application. Passive software metering occurs when application use is simply recorded and no control is asserted over maintaining a maximum concurrent usage level.

References

See also 
 License manager
 Product activation
 Software license
 Systems management
 System administration
 Key server (software licensing)
 License Statistics

System administration
Computer systems